This is a list of Mesoamerican rulers of the altepetl of Tenochtitlan (modern Mexico City) from its foundation in 1325 until the end of the line of indigenous rulers. From c. 1375 onwards, the rulers of Tenochtitlan were monarchs and used the title tlatoani.

From 1427 to 1521, the tlatoque of Tenochtitlan were alongside those of the cities Tetzcoco and Tlacopan the leaders of the powerful Triple Alliance, commonly known as the Aztec Empire. The rulers of Tenochtitlan were always pre-eminent and gradually transitioned into the sole rulers of the empire; under either Tizoc (1481–1486) or Ahuitzotl (1486–1502), the tlatoque of Tenochtitlan assumed the grander title huehuetlatoani ("supreme tlatoani") to indicate their superiority over the other tlatoque in the alliance. The evolution into full autocracy was finished by 1502, when Moctezuma II was elected as huehuetlatoani of Tenochtitlan without the traditional input from Tetzoco and Tlacopan.

In 1521, the Aztec Empire was conquered Spaniards under Hernán Cortés and a large number of Mesoamerican allies. Tenochtitlan was destroyed and replaced by Mexico City, through the Spanish colonial authorities continued to appoint tlatoque of Tenochtitlan until the office was abolished in 1565.

Early Tenochtitlan (1325–1375)

Monarchic period (1375–1525) 
The monarchic period of Tenochtitlan extends from the assumption of the title of tlatoani by Acamapichtli in 1377 to the death of Cuauhtémoc in 1525, after the arrival of the Spaniards. The accession of Acampapichtli c. 1375 marks the traditional beginning of the Aztec king list. The early Tenochtitlan rulers before Itzcoatl were vassals under the suzerainty of the Tepanecs.

Pre-imperial tlatoque (1375–1427)

Aztec Empire (1427–1521)

Colonial period (1525–1565) 
The Spanish colonial authorities continued to appoint tlatoque of Tenochtitlan for several decades after the conquest.

Cuauhtlatoque (1525–1536) 
The initial rulers of Tenochtitlan installed by the Spaniards were not part of the nobility and did not go through the traditional investiture ceremonies. As a result, they were not regarded as legitimate tlatoani by the local populace. Instead, they were titled as cuauhtlatoani, a term that literally meant "eagle ruler" and in pre-conquest times served to designate a non-dynastic interim ruler appointed when necessary. Hernán Cortés and the Spaniards initially preferred such less legitimate rulers, possibly as a way of ensuring that the colonial authorities would be able to maintain control.

Though the cuauhtlatoque appointed by the Spaniards were not legitimate dynastic rulers, they were noted in later chronicles as governing as if they were tlatoani. Codices made after the time of the cuauhtlatoque differ in how they are treated; some emphasize their illegitimacy as a rupture in the dynastic sequence whereas others do not comment on their lack of relation to previous rulers and instead depict them in the exact same way, as if they were genuine tlatoque.

Resumption of dynastic rule (1538–1565) 
The royal line of tlatoque was restored in 1538. The decision to restore dynastic rule was probably made by the Spanish viceroy Antonio de Mendoza (1535–1550) to preserve the veneer of legitimacy of Spanish rule. Since the Spaniards mainly wished local native rulers to be responsible, pay tribute and be legitimate in the eyes of the people they ruled, the tlatoani were from that point onwards most often appointed after being elected and suggested by the native Nahua nobility. 

After 1565, the governors of Tenochtitlan ceased to be appointed under the principle of hereditary succession and ceased to be referred to as tlatoani. This change was partly a result of experiences with Spanish election principles making the denizens of Tenochtitlan view hereditary descent as less important for legitimacy. From the death of Cipac in 1565 until 1688, Tenochtitlan was instead placed under the control of Spanish-appointed governors; these governors continued to be of indigenous or mixed descent and many were descendants of Aztec nobility, though not of the royal dynasty.

See also 
 Family tree of Aztec monarchs
 History of the Aztecs
 The other (subservient) leaders of the Triple Alliance:
 List of rulers of Tetzcoco
 List of rulers of Tlacopan

Notes

References

Bibliography 

 
 
 
 
 
 
 
 
 
 

 
 

 01
Tenochtitlan
Tlatoque